Fournaise (fr. "furnace", "blaze" or "bonfire") may refer to:

Piton de la Fournaise, a volcano on the island of Reunion
Maison Fournaise, a restaurant and museum near Paris